The 18th Annual Screen Actors Guild Awards, honoring the best achievements in film and television performances for the year 2011, were presented on January 29, 2012 at the Shrine Exposition Center in Los Angeles, California for the sixteenth consecutive year. It was broadcast simultaneously by TNT and TBS.

The nominees were announced on December 14, 2011 by actresses Regina King and Judy Greer at Los Angeles' Pacific Design Center's Silver Screen Theater.

Winners and nominees
Winners are listed first and highlighted in boldface.

Film

Television

Screen Actors Guild Life Achievement Award 
 Mary Tyler Moore

In Memoriam
Meryl Streep introduced the 'In Memoriam' segment to pay tribute to the actors who have died in 2011:

 Susannah York
 G. D. Spradlin
 James Arness
 Jane Russell
 Bubba Smith
 Frances Bay
 Kenneth Mars
 Sada Thompson
 William Duell
 Michael Tolan
 Dolores Hope
 John Dye
 Peter Falk
 Cliff Robertson
 Betty Garrett
 Farley Granger
 Andy Whitfield
 John Wood
 Diane Cilento
 Robert Easton
 Roberts Blossom
 Francesco Quinn
 Mary Fickett
 Michael Sarrazin
 Marian Mercer
 Charles Napier
 Clarice Taylor
 Jackie Cooper
 Michael Gough
 Maria Schneider
 John Neville
 Doris Belack
 Dana Wynter
 Len Lesser
 Charlie Callas
 Harry Morgan
 Elizabeth Taylor

See also
 84th Academy Awards
 64th Primetime Emmy Awards
 63rd Primetime Emmy Awards
 69th Golden Globe Awards
 65th British Academy Film Awards
 1st AACTA International Awards
 32nd Golden Raspberry Awards

References

External links

 18th Screen Actors Guild Awards at IMDb 

2011
2011 film awards
2011 television awards
Screen
Screen
January 2012 events in the United States